Gallitzin may be:

People
 Demetrius Augustine Gallitzin (1770–1840), an American Roman Catholic priest

Places
 Gallitzin, Pennsylvania, US
 Gallitzin Township, Pennsylvania, US
 Gallitzin State Forest, Pennsylvania, US

See also
 House of Golitsyn, sometimes transliterated Galitsin or Galitzine